Rough and Rowdy Ways World Wide Tour is the current ongoing tour by American singer-songwriter Bob Dylan in support of his 39th studio album Rough and Rowdy Ways (2020). The tour began in Milwaukee, Wisconsin on November 2, 2021 and is scheduled to continue through to 2024.

Background
Dylan's 39th studio album was released in June 2020. The release was originally set to coincide with Dylan's 2020 Never Ending Tour with Nathaniel Rateliff & the Night Sweats and The Hot Club of Cowtown. The 'Never Ending Tour 2020' was then postponed and later cancelled entirely due to the COVID-19 pandemic.

Shadow Kingdom: The Early Songs of Bob Dylan, a live-streamed concert film, was later released in July 2021 in lieu of any live performances. Shadow Kingdom showcases Dylan in an intimate setting as he performs songs from his extensive body of work, created especially for this event. It marked his first concert performance since December 2019, and first performance since his universally acclaimed album Rough and Rowdy Ways. The earliest composition in the set list was "It's All Over Now, Baby Blue" from the 1965 album Bringing It All Back Home and the most recent composition was "What Was It You Wanted" from 1989's Oh Mercy.

The Rough and Rowdy Ways World Wide Tour (2021-2024) was announced in September 2021. The shows were announced as the first leg of a world tour in support of Dylan's album Rough And Rowdy Ways, set to run until 2024. It was the first time he had played to a live audience since December 2019, with the ongoing COVID-19 pandemic forcing Dylan to pause his decades-long 'Never Ending Tour'.

In Milwaukee, Wisconsin on November 2, 2021, the first show of the first leg of the tour, Dylan introduced two new members of his touring band: drummer Charley Drayton, replacing Matt Chamberlain, and guitarist Doug Lancio, replacing Charlie Sexton. Dylan played eight of the 10 songs from Rough and Rowdy Ways at every show on this leg of the tour, which was acclaimed by critics, some of whom noted that it was rare for a "legacy artist" to focus so extensively on recent material in live performance.

On January 24, 2022 a further twenty-seven concerts were announced taking place in the Southern United States, beginning in Phoenix, Arizona in early March and ending in Oklahoma City in mid-April. On April 18, 2022, Dylan announced, via his website, the third consecutive U.S. leg of the tour, this time covering the Western United States and running from May 28 to July 6.

On July 13, 2022 Dylan announced the fall leg of the Rough and Rowdy Ways World Wide Tour, encompassing the first dates outside of the United States. This European leg kicked off in Oslo, Norway on September 25 and ended in Dublin, Ireland on November 7.

On February 8, 2023 Dylan announced the first Asian dates of the tour. These first 2023 concerts will take place in Japan, beginning on April 6 and concluding on April 20, and comprising multiple shows in Osaka, Tokyo and Nagoya.

On March 10, 2023 Dylan announced European tour dates in June and July. This leg of the tour is scheduled to begin in Porto, Portugal on June 2 and end in Rome, Italy on July 9.

Set list
This set list is representative of the performance on November 20, 2021 in New York City, New York. It does not represent the set list at all concerts for the duration of the tour.

"Watching the River Flow"
"Most Likely You Go Your Way and I'll Go Mine"
"I Contain Multitudes"
"False Prophet"
"When I Paint My Masterpiece"
"Black Rider"
"I'll Be Your Baby Tonight"
"My Own Version of You"
"Early Roman Kings"
"To Be Alone with You"
"Key West (Philosopher Pirate)"
"Gotta Serve Somebody"
"I've Made Up My Mind to Give Myself to You"
"Melancholy Mood" (Walter Schumann, Vick Knight)
"Mother of Muses"
"Goodbye Jimmy Reed"
"Every Grain of Sand"

Tour dates

Notes

Band

Bob Dylan: Vocals, piano, guitar, harmonica
Bob Britt: Guitar
Charley Drayton: Drums
Tony Garnier: Bass guitar
Donnie Herron: Accordion, violin, electric mandolin, pedal steel guitar and lap steel guitar
Doug Lancio: Guitar

Timeline

References

External links
BobLinks – Comprehensive log of concerts and set lists
BobDylan.com – Bob Dylan's Official Website Tour Page
Bjorner's Still on the Road – Information on recording sessions and performances

Bob Dylan concert tours
2021 concert tours
2022 concert tours
2023 concert tours